The Lukiiko (sometimes Great Lukiiko) is the Parliament of the Kingdom of Buganda. It was, according to tradition, established by Kato Kintu, the first Kabaka of Buganda, after defeating the rival prince Bbemba, when he called a general meeting of influential people at Magongo. It took its present form as a result of the Buganda Agreement of 1900 and subsequent agreements.

The Lukiiko is today convened at the Bulange. The membership consists of directly-elected members from Buganda counties, Buganda county chiefs, members appointed by the Kabaka, and Buganda cabinet ministers. The current speaker is Nelson Kawalya, and the deputy speaker is Ahmed Lwasa. The Lukiiko is charged with legislating by-laws of the kingdom, but is not allowed by the state government to legislate political matters.

External links
 Website

Buganda
Politics of Uganda
Legislatures of country subdivisions